Carl Alexandre, a representative from the United States, was appointed Deputy Special Representative of the United Nations Stabilization Mission in Haiti (MINUSTAH) by the United Nations Secretary-General Ban Ki-moon on 17 January 2013.

Prior to his appointment, Mr. Alexandre has been serving as Director of the Office of Overseas Prosecutorial Development, Assistance and Training, Criminal Division oaf the U.S. Department of Justice. In this position, he managed the prosecutorial training and legal system development programs.

From 1994 to 1997, Mr. Alexandre worked as Resident Legal Advisor in the U.S. Embassy in Port-au-Prince, Haiti for the U.S. Department of Justice. He was a senior trial attorney of the U.S. Department of Justice in 1989.

Mr. Alexandre obtained his Bachelor of Arts from the City University of New York in government and public administration and his J.D. from Oklahoma City University School of Law.

References

American officials of the United Nations
Living people
American diplomats
Year of birth missing (living people)
Place of birth missing (living people)
City University of New York alumni
Oklahoma City University School of Law alumni
American lawyers